The Devil Dogs were an American, New York-based garage punk band, started in 1989 by Andy Gortler (guitars), Steve Baise (bass) and Paul Corio (drums).

Two members of the Devil Dogs (Gortler and Baise) had been members of the Rat Bastards when that band dissolved during the recording of an album; they regrouped as The Devil Dogs and continued recording. Drummer Mighty Joe Vincent joined the group in 1991. They parted in late 1994.

Steve Baise moved on and collaborated with members of Turbonegro on a mid-1990s band called The Vikings.

Discography
Devil Dogs LP (Crypt Records, 1989, CR-019)
Big Beef Bonanza MLP (Crypt, 1990, CR-022)
Devil's Hits CD (1+2 Records, 1991, 1+2 CD 008)
We Three Kings MLP/MCD (Crypt, 1991, CR-028)
30 Sizzling Slabs CD (Crypt, 1992, CR-CD-192228)
Saturday Night Fever LP (Crypt, 1993, CR-035)
Saturday Night Fever CD (Sympathy For The Record Industry, 1993, SFTRI 231)
Live At The Revolver Club - The Greatest Rock 'N' Roll Album You'll Never Hear! LP (Impossible Records, 1993, Impossible 022)
... Stereodrive! CD (1+2 Records, 1994, 1+2 CD 060)
Choadblast CD (Empty Records, 1994, MTR-218)
Bigger Beef Bonanza! CD (Crypt, 1996, CR-022)
No Requests Tonight LP/CD (Sympathy For The Record Industry, 1997, SFTRI 310)

References

Punk rock groups from New York (state)
Garage punk groups
Indie rock musical groups from New York (state)
Musical groups from New York City
Garage rock groups from New York (state)